Subbayya or Subbaiah (Telugu: సుబ్బయ్య, Kannada: ಸುಬ್ಬಯ್ಯ) is an Indian name commonly used in Andhra Pradesh, Kodagu (in Karnataka) and Tamil Nadu.
 Kodandera Subayya Thimayya, Indian General
 M.V. Subbaiah Naidu, Kannada and Telugu actor and director.
 Jagadeesh Subbaiah Moodera, Indian origin American physicist in MIT
 Subbayya Sivasankaranarayana Pillai, Indian mathematician, well known for his work in number theory
 Nidhi Subbaiah, Kannada actress
 S. M. Subbaiah Naidu, South Indian composer, conductor, and orchestrator
 Mutyala Subbayya, Tollywood film director